Frank H. McCourt Jr. (born August 14, 1953) is an American business executive and philanthropist. As of 2023, he is the executive chairman and former CEO of McCourt Global, current owner of the football club Olympique de Marseille, and founder and executive chairman of international non-profit Project Liberty. He was the owner and chairman of the Los Angeles Dodgers and Dodger Stadium from 2004 to 2012.

In 2004, he purchased a controlling interest in the Dodgers from Fox Entertainment Group, owned by Rupert Murdoch's News Corporation. Prior to purchasing the Dodgers and moving to Los Angeles, McCourt was a Boston real estate developer, whose family resided in Brookline, Massachusetts.

In 2013, he donated $100 million to establish the McCourt School of Public Policy, the ninth school of Georgetown University. He made a second $100 million gift to Georgetown University in March 2021, for the express purpose of ensuring that "the McCourt School can open its doors more widely and build a pipeline of future public policy leaders that reflects the true diversity of our communities."

In 2016, he purchased French Ligue 1 football club Olympique de Marseille from Russian-born billionaire Margarita Louis-Dreyfus. The takeover was completed in August after months of negotiations.

In 2021, he founded the non-profit Project Liberty. The initiative has multiple components which includes the development of a Decentralized Social Networking Protocol (DSNP), the founding of the McCourt Institute with founding academic partners Georgetown University in Washington, D.C. and Sciences Po in Paris, and a network of partners within the Unfinished network.

In 2023, he transitioned from CEO of McCourt Global to executive chairman and announced Shéhérazade Semsar de Boisséson, former POLITICO Europe CEO, as McCourt Global's CEO.

Early years and business background
McCourt was born in Boston, Massachusetts. He was raised as a Catholic and attended Georgetown University, where he earned an economics degree in 1975. He met his future wife, Jamie Luskin, when they were both freshmen at Georgetown.  They married in 1979.  The McCourt family has a long association with real estate and construction in the Boston area.

In 1977, McCourt founded The McCourt Company, which specializes in the development of major commercial real estate projects.

The McCourt company headquarters moved to Los Angeles in 2004 in connection with the family relocating to Los Angeles. The McCourts owned a $16 million,  home in Brookline, Massachusetts, that was acquired by John W. Henry, owner of the Boston Red Sox.

Failed Red Sox bid
Before buying the Los Angeles Dodgers, McCourt made a bid to buy the Boston Red Sox planning to build a new stadium on the land he owned and used for parking lots on the South Boston waterfront. Instead, the Red Sox were sold in 2002 to John W. Henry, Tom Werner and Red Sox President Larry Lucchino.

Los Angeles Dodgers

Purchase of the L.A. Dodgers
In 2004, McCourt bought the Los Angeles Dodgers for US$430 million from NewsCorp, Rupert Murdoch's flagship enterprise. McCourt's purchase of the Dodgers was financed mostly by debt.

In 2004 McCourt's South Boston parking lot property was used as collateral for some of the financing to acquire the Dodgers from NewsCorp.  Later the South Boston property was turned over to NewsCorp in exchange for canceling acquisition debt.  NewsCorp received approximately $200 million when they re-sold the property to Morgan Stanley and Boston real estate investor John B. Hynes III in 2006.

The Dodgers assets acquired by McCourt included significant real estate assets related to the stadium in Chavez Ravine, including stadium parking lot land. Plans were announced for new real estate developments at Dodger Stadium however those plans never came to fruition. One discussed plan was for an NFL stadium and adjacent retail complex. However after the Boston Herald reported the details of the plan, political pressure forced both the NFL and McCourt to deny that either party was aggressively pursuing the idea.

To offset the purchase, McCourt raised ticket and concession prices every year. By April 2009 the team and its related assets, in which McCourt had invested heavily in improvements, had increased in value to $722 million according to Forbes.

 In 2010 the value of the team was estimated at $727 million according to Forbes.

McCourt is not the first member of this family to own part or whole of a sports franchise. His grandfather was part-owner of the Boston Braves.

Hiring and firing of Paul DePodesta
In 2003 (under NewsCorp ownership) the Dodgers' record was 85 wins, 77 losses.  Shortly after purchasing the team, McCourt fired then General Manager Dan Evans, replacing him with Paul DePodesta. DePodesta is featured (along with Billy Beane) in the book Moneyball as it discussed their sabermetric-based approach to using statistics to build the Oakland A's.  In Los Angeles, DePodesta made a trade in the middle of the 2004 season that sent the Dodgers' starting catcher, Paul Lo Duca, its set-up man, pitcher Guillermo Mota, and outfielder Juan Encarnación to the Florida Marlins for the high on-base percentage first baseman Hee-Seop Choi and power pitcher Brad Penny and pitching prospect Bill Murphy, who was in turn flipped with Koyie Hill and Reggie Abercrombie to the Arizona Diamondbacks for Gold Glove center fielder Steve Finley and catcher Brent Mayne. At the time, DePodesta said of Choi, "I think we've acquired one of the better offensive players in the league."

Finley hit 13 home runs for the Dodgers in his two months with the team. Choi batted .161 with no home runs for the Dodgers after the trade, though he walked 11 times in 87 plate appearances. In the playoff loss to St. Louis that season, Penny did not play, Choi had one at bat (hitless) and Dodger catchers were 3-for-10.

In 2004, the Dodgers won the NL West with a record of 93-69, but lost in four games to the St. Louis Cardinals in the Divisional Series. In the offseason the Dodgers decided not to re-sign Adrián Beltré due to his high contract demands (Beltre finished second in the NL MVP voting and would later sign with Seattle for 5 years/$64 million). DePodesta signed outfielder J. D. Drew for five years at $55 million, sinkerball pitcher Derek Lowe for four years at $36 million, and All-Star second baseman Jeff Kent.

However, the 2005 season, with a record of 71—91, was the Dodgers' second-worst record since moving to Los Angeles, due in part to players' injuries. That off-season, manager Jim Tracy was fired. Soon after Tracy was fired, McCourt fired DePodesta and about a month later, hired Ned Colletti to replace him.

Ned Colletti/Joe Torre era
Ned Colletti's first action as GM was the signing of the former Red Sox manager, Grady Little. Colletti then signed several veteran players such as Rafael Furcal, Nomar Garciaparra, Kenny Lofton, and Bill Mueller. These players were among those who led the 2006 Dodgers to the NL Wild Card spot, with an 88–74 record. The Dodgers were swept by the New York Mets in the National League Division Series. In the winter of 2006–07 the team signed Juan Pierre, Jason Schmidt, and Luis Gonzalez.

In October 2007, Grady Little resigned and Joe Torre was hired as their new manager. In 2008 with Torre, Ned Colletti signed Andruw Jones, Hiroki Kuroda, and Chan Ho Park. During the trade deadline the Dodgers acquired Manny Ramirez in a trade with the Boston Red Sox.

In 2007 Dr. Charles Steinberg was hired as executive vice president, marketing and public relations, of the Dodgers after working with the Boston Red Sox and Baltimore Orioles. In 2009, he was reported to be on his way out and was said to be allied with Jamie McCourt and had lost influence as she did, according to a report in the Los Angeles Times.

Dodgers' Dream Foundation
In 2010, it was revealed that then California Attorney General Jerry Brown was opening an investigation into the Dodgers' charitable foundation, the Dodgers' Dream Foundation. According to tax returns, the charity's chief executive, Howard Sunkin, earned a salary of nearly $400,000 per year, almost a quarter of the foundation's entire budget. Sunkin is a close associate of McCourt and has worked with him during his divorce proceedings.  The courts eventually awarded the funds to be repaid, and McCourt personally repaid $100,000.

Divorce proceedings
On October 14, 2009, it was announced the McCourts would be separating after nearly 30 years of marriage. While speculation was raised on the impact upon the McCourt family and Dodger ownership, a spokesperson for Jamie McCourt said the following day that "the focus of the Dodgers is on the playoffs and the World Series." Jamie was fired from her position as Dodgers CEO on Thursday, October 22, 2009, the day after the Dodgers were eliminated from the playoffs. She officially filed for divorce shortly thereafter. He has claimed that the divorce has "no bearing on the team whatsoever."

On December 7, 2010, the judge in the divorce case of the McCourts invalidated the post-nuptial marital property agreement ("MPA") that Frank McCourt had claimed provided him with sole ownership of the Dodgers. In the wake of this decision, Frank McCourt's lawyers said that Frank would use other legal avenues to establish his sole ownership of the Dodgers, while Jamie McCourt's lawyers said that Jamie would be confirmed as the co-owner of the team as community property of their marriage.

On June 17, 2011, the McCourts reached agreement on a settlement of their divorce. The settlement was contingent upon Major League Baseball approving a 17-year television contract between the Dodgers and Fox Sports West and Prime Ticket. The discussion set aside the Dodgers' ownership issue until a scheduled one-day trial on August 4, whereupon if the judge sided with Frank he would keep the team and pay a settlement fee to Jamie and if the judge sided with her the team would be sold. However, on June 20, baseball rejected the television deal and the settlement agreement fell apart.

On October 17, 2011, the McCourts reached a settlement in their divorce case whereby Jamie would receive about $130 million and relinquish her claim on the Dodgers. This ended what is widely believed to be the costliest divorce in California history.

Ownership dispute with Major League Baseball: Bankruptcy and sale of the Dodgers

In April 2011, MLB Commissioner Bud Selig announced that as part of an MLB investigation into McCourt's stewardship of the Dodgers, he would be appointing a representative to oversee the team's day-to-day operations. In effect, the commissioner's office seized control of the team. His statement said that he took that action because of his "deep concerns for the finances and operations" of the Dodgers. This event occurred shortly after an LA Times report that McCourt had obtained a personal loan from Fox to cover the team's payroll for April and May. McCourt vigorously disputed MLB's actions. Nevertheless, Selig appointed former diplomat and former Texas Rangers executive Tom Schieffer to oversee the Dodgers' finances. On June 27, the Dodgers filed for Chapter 11 Bankruptcy protection.

After much legal wrangling between McCourt's lawyers and MLB lawyers in bankruptcy court, he reached a deal with the league to put the team up for sale. On March 27, 2012, he agreed to sell the team to a group consisting of  former L.A. Laker Magic Johnson, former baseball executive Stan Kasten and the Guggenheim Partners for a record price of $2 billion, the highest ever for a professional sports team. McCourt separately sold the land surrounding the stadium for $150 million to the same group, while maintaining some economic interest in the property. According to the Guggenheim Group, McCourt has no control or influence over the land, but will profit from potential future development of it. Also, the new ownership pays $14 million to rent the parking lots surrounding Dodger Stadium from an entity half-owned by McCourt. The sale officially closed on May 1, 2012, ending McCourt's turbulent period as Dodgers owner.

Los Angeles Marathon
In 2008, McCourt bought the operating rights to the Los Angeles Marathon. McCourt's group changed the route of the Marathon so that it would start at Dodger Stadium. His "Stadium to the Sea" course revitalized the Marathon and in 2010 it drew the largest field in the history of the race. During his divorce he briefly considered selling the Marathon, but he chose to retain the rights and refocus on the race.

McCourt announced in 2019 that he would donate the Los Angeles Marathon and parent company Conqur Endurance to The McCourt Foundation, a Boston-based philanthropic organization overseen by his cousin, Brian McCourt. The vision for combining the entities was to catalyze the social impact potential of both organizations by creating a bicoastal portfolio of events that promote healthier communities. The McCourt Foundation is "dedicated to enhancing the lives of patients and families affected by health-challenges within the neurology community and beyond," and hosts several endurance sport events to raise funds and awareness for neurological health.

Global Champions Tour
In 2014, McCourt bought 50% of the Global Champions Tour.

In 2017, Frank and Monica McCourt founded a show jumping team, the Miami Celtics. 

In March 2022, Jan Tops acquired McCourt's share and once again became the sole owner of Global Champions Tour. McCourt franchised the equestrian show jumping team Miami Celtics team for the 2022 spring season.

Olympique de Marseille
On August 29, 2016, McCourt entered exclusive negotiations to purchase the French Ligue 1 club Olympique de Marseille from Margarita Louis-Dreyfus. The purchase deal was completed for a reported  price tag of €45 million on October 17, 2016. Within the next few days, he appointed Jacques-Henri Eyraud (a French businessman) as the club's president and Rudi Garcia as coach of the club's first team. He pledged to invest €200 million in the club over the next four years.

For the first transfer window in the McCourt era in January 2017, Marseille reinforced the team with the purchase of Dimitri Payet, Patrice Evra, Morgan Sanson, and Grégory Sertic, for a total of around €45M.

In 2021, McCourt came out publicly against the proposed UEFA "Super League." In an op-ed in newspaper Le Monde, he drew a direct parallel between the opaque centralization of power in both the domains of football and technology, stating that, "We need to think of our institutions not as purely profit-seeking enterprises designed to funnel money and influence to a monopolistic private few, but as part of a larger ecosystem that impacts the public good."

Project Liberty
In 2021, McCourt announced $100 million funding for a non-profit initiative called Project Liberty, with the intention to "construct a new internet infrastructure." The investment first went into funding the development of Decentralized Social Networking Protocol (DSNP), which is an open source code that developers can use to build social apps and services. It also included the founding of a "digital governance" institution called McCourt Institute at Georgetown University in Washington, D.C., and Sciences Po in Paris, to support research on "technology that serves the common good" and public discussions that aim to "influence the direction taken by technology and its players," according to McCourt in an interview with Usbek & Rica. The effort has a multi-track approach, beyond the focus on technology in the beginning; it is building on other components including governance, policy, and movement.

In 2022, McCourt appointed Martina Larkin as Project Liberty's first CEO.

Technology
Unfinished Labs / DSNP
McCourt founded Unfinished, and Unfinished Labs, its technology research and development arm, in 2020. The first project of Unfinished Labs — the introduction of the open-source Decentralized Social Networking Protocol (DSNP) — became the foundation of Project Liberty.

MeWe, a free and subscription-based social media platform that bills itself as a privacy-focused Facebook alternative, became the first platform to pledge support by migrating its platform to DSNP in September 2022.

McCourt Institute
In June 2021, Frank McCourt announced the creation of the McCourt Institute as the newest branch of Unfinished. The two foundational partners of the institute are Georgetown University in Washington, DC, and Sciences Po in Paris.

The McCourt Institute building was unveiled at Sciences Po in March 2022, on the occasion of the university's 50th anniversary.

At the McCourt Institute's inaugural event on Sciences Po's campus, McCourt announced the funding of $2.3 million to Georgetown and Sciences Po faculty to select grantees, furthering scholarship from Georgetown specialists in digital governance. Georgetown later announced the 2022 recipients of grantees, including 28 researchers and 17 projects.

The McCourt Institute also provided funding for Frances Haugen's nonprofit, Beyond the Screen, as Haugen announced at Unfinished Live 2022. Haugen received funding from Project Liberty for a "Duty of Care" initiative, aimed at studying harms and identifying practices to deter them.

Unfinished
Unfinished Network
Unfinished is an organization that focuses on bringing together a network of partners that includes nonprofits and advocacy organizations, and hosts events, including Unfinished Live and Unfinished Camp which took place in Venice in April 2022, to support Project Liberty goals.

Unfinished Live
The first initiative of the Unfinished Network was Unfinished Live, a four-episode digital event series which debuted in 2020.

The second annual Unfinished Live was held in-person in New York City from September 23–25, 2021. The event theme was "The Future is Decentralized". The event was hosted at The Shed, a cultural center in Manhattan which Frank McCourt donated $45 million to at its inception. The event was a convening of Unfinished's network partners and speakers that included journalists, technologists, and artists, together with host Baratunde Thurston. The event included a free public exhibit by artist Refik Anadol, titled "Project Liberty Experience" after the founding initiative of Unfinished. The exhibit intended audiences to "experience a world where you own and control your data."

In September 2022, Unfinished hosted the third annual event in New York City. It once again hosted a "Project Liberty Experience," an immersive installation by  artist Refik Anadol. The three day event took place September 22–24, 2022, with an additional "Day Zero" event on September 21 which included the convening of a Student Assembly consisting of participants – 15 from Sciences Po in Paris and 15 from Georgetown University in Washington, D.C. – who were selected from more than 550 applicants.

Personal life
McCourt's grandfather was part-owner of the Boston Braves along with Lou Perini and others. Inspired by his grandfather and the others' formation of the Jimmy Fund, McCourt started ThinkCure to fight cancer.

McCourt was formerly married to Jamie. In 2015, McCourt remarried to Monica Algarra. McCourt has six children.

McCourt owns homes in Mashpee and Cotuit, Massachusetts.

References

External links
"Frank McCourt Wants to Build a New Model for Social Media" - Wall Street Journal
"‘Privacy is at stake': what would you do if you controlled your own data?" - The Guardian
"This billionaire is pouring $100M into a decentralized Facebook alternative" - Fast Company
"A Real Estate Mogul Has a $100 Million Plan to Save the Internet" — Bloomberg
"Project Liberty launched with $100 million from Frank McCourt"
"An Unfinished Beginning" — The Aspen Institute
"Frank McCourt: Tech's Super League Is Already Here" — Le Monde
"Georgetown alum pledges second $100 million gift to public policy school" — Washington Post
"Billionaire Frank McCourt Makes $45 Million Donation to Manhattan Cultural Institution" — Barron's
"An Ex-Owner of the Dodgers Takes Another Swing in Marseille" — New York Times
"The top 10 worst owners in MLB history"—ESPN.com
NBC Sports: "Gagne rips Dodgers' front office for being frugal"
Boston.com: "McCourt far from blue"
"History of McCourts' ownership a tumultuous one"

1953 births
American real estate businesspeople
Baseball people from Massachusetts
Businesspeople from Boston
Georgetown University alumni
Living people
Los Angeles Dodgers executives
Los Angeles Dodgers owners
Major League Baseball executives
Major League Baseball owners
Olympique de Marseille
People from Brookline, Massachusetts
People from Mashpee, Massachusetts
People from Cotuit, Massachusetts
Sportspeople from Norfolk County, Massachusetts
Sportspeople from Barnstable County, Massachusetts
Catholics from Massachusetts
Chairmen and investors of football clubs in France
Georgetown College (Georgetown University) alumni